Hamatabanus is a genus of horse flies in the family Tabanidae.

Species
Hamatabanus annularis (Hine, 1917)
Hamatabanus carolinensis (Macquart, 1838)
Hamatabanus sexfasciatus (Stone, 1935)

References

Tabanidae
Brachycera genera
Diptera of North America
Taxa named by Cornelius Becker Philip